Heiko Schwarz (born 23 August 1989 in Cottbus) is a German footballer who plays for ASCK Simbach/Inn.

Schwarz made his professional debut for FC Energie Cottbus as a substitute for Alexander Bittroff in a 2. Fußball-Bundesliga match against Karlsruher SC in 2009.

References

External links 
 

1989 births
Living people
Sportspeople from Cottbus
German footballers
Association football midfielders
2. Bundesliga players
3. Liga players
FC Energie Cottbus players
FC Energie Cottbus II players
SV Wacker Burghausen players
SV Babelsberg 03 players
Footballers from Brandenburg